Vickie Winans (born Viviane Bowman; October 18, 1953) is an American gospel singer.

Early life 
The seventh of twelve children, Winans was born in Michigan to Mattie A. Bowman, a housewife, and Aaron Bowman, who worked at various times as a laborer, contractor, carpenter and mason. She began singing in church – the International Gospel Center – at the age of eight, and as a teenager she sang with a group known as the International Sounds of Deliverance. Her siblings include Beverly Bouldes, Sandi Tyler, Irma Crockett, Annette Tharpe, Aaron Bowman, Jr. (deceased), Carleen Riley, Cathy Williams, Mary Sturdivant, Bryan Bowman, Lorne Bowman, and Tim Bowman.

Personal life 
Winans has been married and divorced three times. After high school, she married the late Bishop Ronald E. Brown of Faith Tabernacle Deliverance Temple in Orangeburg, South Carolina. Together they had a son, Mario Brown, now known as Mario Winans. In June 1978, she married Marvin Winans of the gospel group The Winans. With Marvin she had one son, Marvin Jr. (Coconut).  In 1995, Winans and Marvin Sr. divorced after 16 years of marriage. The stress of the divorce caused her to develop ulcers on her esophagus, diabetes and to gain weight. Eventually, Winans regained her health and re-energized her career. At the end of 2003, Winans married businessman Joe McLemore. This marriage lasted just a few years before Vickie divorced him (Joe died in 2018). Vickie lost her mother, Evangelist Mattie Bowman, on December 12, 2006.

Musical career 
It was her marriage to Marvin that led Winans to consider a career in music. She was asked to, and joined, Winans Part II, a group that included then in-laws BeBe and CeCe Winans and brother Daniel Winans. However, the group never took off as BeBe and CeCe left to join the PTL Singers of the long-running Christian television show, The PTL Club.

Light Records: 1985–1990 
The Winans became the best selling act on their record label, Light Records, and this enabled husband Marvin to secure her a recording contract.  Her solo album, Be Encouraged was released in 1987 and became a major gospel hit. The LP included a cover of Dottie Rambo's, "We Shall Behold Him", as well as "First Trumpet Sound," a gospelized remake of Gladys Knight & The Pips' "Midnight Train To Georgia." Be Encouraged netted a Grammy nomination for Best Soul Gospel Performance, Female, a Stellar Award for Album of the Year, and an Excellence Award for Best Female Contemporary Artist.

Her follow-up album, Total Victory was markedly less successful, due in part to the financial floundering of Light Records after its flagship group, The Winans, left to join Quincy Jones' Qwest Records.

MCA Records: 1990–1991 
In 1990, Winans signed, not to a gospel recording company but to Geffen Records. Geffen was bought by Universal Records and Winan's contract was shifted to sister label MCA Records. Dealing with a company that hadn't signed her, she found herself being subtly pushed to tone down the Christian message in her music. "They don't tell you, but you get the vibe," she said in 1999. "I don't ever, ever, ever want to be in that predicament again. It's one thing when you just sing a song where you don't use the actual name of Jesus, but it's a whole 'nother thing when you TRY not to use the name. For me, the name of Jesus will never be distasteful in my mouth. He's always the answer".

Her 1991 MCA release was The Lady which included production by R. Kelly, husband Marvin Winans, and her son Mario. The nine-song album was missing the name Jesus and controversially contained a rendition of West Side Story'''s "Somewhere". MCA then sent Winans to that year's Stellar Awards television broadcast with dancers – a move that shocked the conservative Christian community, leading to the Winans having to issue a public apology.

This controversy led to the Gospel community not backing the album, and after also failing to break through on contemporary R&B radio, MCA eventually dropped Winans from their roster. The Lady, also, netted a Grammy nomination for Best Contemporary Soul Gospel Album.

 Intersound/CGI: 1994–2002 
After 3 years without a recording contract, former Word Records executive James Bullard signed Winans to Intersound Records, an Atlanta-based classical recording label, for which he was forming a gospel music division. Her label debut Vickie Winans rose to #10 on the gospel charts, spawning the hits Work It Out and We Shall Behold Him. However, she developed nodes on her vocal cords, causing her to fail to hit all the right notes in her re-recording of We Shall Behold Him.

 Live in Detroit 
She ran across a James Cleveland classic tune from the 1960s called "Long As I Got King Jesus" and used it as the lead single and megahit for a traditionally-styled album in 1997 titled Live In Detroit. Recorded live at Bishop Andrew Merrit's Straight Gate Church, Winans recorded simple arrangements of "Great Is Thy Faithfulness", Bill Gaither's "Because He Lives" and Candi Staton's "The Blood Rushes". Another James Cleveland classic, "No Cross, No Crown", was also a hit from the album.

Intersound/CGI financed a video for "Long As I Got King Jesus", that boosted the sales of the album. It eventually sold 200,000 units.  The album earned Winans a Grammy nomination for Best Soul Gospel Album and two Stellar Award nominations for Best Female Vocalist and Best Video ("Long As I Got King Jesus").

 Live in Detroit II and Share the Laughter 
Intersound/CGI planned to release three Winans albums in 1999; a May release of Live In Detroit II, followed by the Share The Laughter comedy album in July and capping the year with an October release called "Woman To Woman: Songs Of Survival". They launched their most expensive marketing campaign ever to promote the project . They bought full page color ads in magazines, shot a concept video for the song "Already Been To The Water" and hired Capital Entertainment (which handled CeCe Winans and Bishop T. D. Jakes at the time) to handle Winans' press coverage. They were able to book Winans on Queen Latifah, various BET shows and Jenny Jones, among other high-profile television programs and got her the most press coverage she'd had since she toured with the Winans Family Tour in 1992.Live in Detroit II was a major success, reaching #3 on the gospel charts, only failing to top the charts because of Kirk Franklin's success with The Nu Nation Project in the same year.Share the Laughter did not do as well, but for a standup comedy album, its sales were far from disappointing considering Intersound/CGI was on its last legs and soon closed.

 Hiatus: 2000–2002 
Winans' troubles with recording companies continued after Intersound/CGI closed and released her from her contract. In early 2000, she signed with Tommy Boy Gospel.  Woman To Woman was scheduled as the third album in the trilogy, but the label folded before the album could be released.

In 2002, she signed with Verity Records at the invitation of her longtime friend Max Siegel who had assumed leadership of the label.

 Verity Records: 2003–2006 
After a four-year hiatus, in 2003 Winans release Bringing It All Together which featured "Shake Yourself Loose", written and produced by her son, Mario. Leaving nothing to chance, she dipped deep into her own pockets to create a marketing strategy that most gospel labels would never spend on a project. She spent well over $200,000 creating five music videos, hiring independent radio teams, promotional marketing teams and creating a 50 city-promotional concert tour to launch the CD.

The strategy paid off as the album debuted at #1 on the Billboard gospel music charts. It spent nine weeks at #1 and a full year in the Top 10. The album also garnered 8 Stellar Award nominations, winning 5, and a Grammy nomination.Woman to Woman: Songs of Life, was released on August 8, 2006.

 How I Got Over How I Got Over (Destiny Joy Records) is the name of Winans' self-produced CD that was released on August 25, 2009. The eleven-song project is a blend of traditional and urban contemporary songs. Her first radio single, "How I Got Over" is Winans' personal testimony. Taking a line from an old hymn classic favorite, Winans creates a brand new song that celebrates her victories, faith and trust in God. It opens with an upbeat, but old school church flavor and breaks down into a contemporary vamp before she slams a closing with her nephew, Tim Bowman, Jr. who lays down some jazzy scats. The song's music video was shot in the basement of Winans' home. This album gained Winans a Grammy nomination for Best Traditional Gospel Album.

 Other ventures 
 Destiny Joy Records 
Winans requested and was granted a release from her recording contract with Verity Records in order to pursue her independent venture, Destiny Joy Records. The new label's name is personal to Vickie:
 "Right after I had my son, Coconut (Marvin Winans Jr.), I got pregnant with a little girl. We were planning to name her Destiny Joy Winans. Unfortunately, however, I miscarried during my fifth month and lost my baby who only weighed one pound. I named that baby Marvlyn Loreal Winans after her father Marvin Lawrence Winans Sr and kept the name Destiny Joy alive – not knowing one day that I would start this label and name it after her".

Through Destiny Joy, she intended to release a fitness DVD titled Laugh While You Lose, a comedy DVD, and a Christmas album, in addition to releases from signees Denise Tichenor and Datisha Pickett.

 Television and film 
Her profile on BET's Sunday morning TV series "Lift Every Voice" remains the most watched episode in that program's history with over 800,000 viewers.

Black Entertainment Television (BET) signed Winans to host a new comedy TV series, "A Time to Laugh." The show intended to focus on good clean family comedy. Winans had already begun taping and was signed on to tape 30 episodes that feature her, other G-rated comedians and inspirational music. The series was supposed to debut on BET in January 2010, but never aired. In 2011, Winans premiered her new video for the song Release It, from her mega hit album How I Got Over. Also in 2011, she was cast for a part in the 2012 film Sparkle. Discography 

 Albums 
 Be Encouraged (Light, 1985)
 Total Victory (Light, 1989)
 Best of All (Light, 1991)
 The Lady (Selah/MCA, 1991)
 Vickie Winans (Intersound, 1995)
 Live In Detroit (Intersound, 1997)
 Live In Detroit II (Intersound, 1999)
 Share the Laughter (CGI/Platinum, 1999)
 Best of Vickie Winans (CGI/Platinum, 2002)
 Bringing It All Together (Verity platinum, 2003)
 Greatest Hits (Light/Artemis, 2005)
 Woman to Woman: Songs of Life (Verity, 2006)
 Happy Holidays from Vickie Winans (Destiny Joy, 2007)
 Praise & Worship (Verity, 2008)
 How I Got Over (Destiny Joy, 2009)
 How I Got Over Remix (Destiny Joy, 2010)
 Radio One Family Comdedy Tour, Vol.1 (Destiny Joy, 2010)
 Vickie Winans "Unplugged and Hilarious" Comedy DVD Vol.1 (Destiny Joy, 2012)
 Vickie Winans "Unplugged and Hilarious" Comedy DVD Vol.2 (Destiny Joy, 2012)

Notable singles 
 "Don't Throw Your Life Away"
 "We Shall Behold Him"
 "Just When (featuring Marvin Winans)"
 "Work It Out"
 "Shake Yourself Loose"
 "It's Alright"
 "Special Day"
 "The Rainbow"
 "Kids Love Jesus Too"
 "How I Got Over"
 "Holiday Jam"
 "Release it"
 "Long As I Got King Jesus"

References

External links 
www.vickiewinans.com Vickie Winans official Internet site

1953 births
Living people
Singers from Detroit
American gospel singers
Urban contemporary gospel musicians
Grammy Award winners
African-American Christians
21st-century American women singers
Winans family
21st-century American singers
African-American women musicians
21st-century African-American women singers
20th-century African-American people
20th-century African-American women